Ross Brown (born 17 October 1981) is an Australian former national and world champion lightweight rower.

Club and state rowing
Born in Bentley, Western Australia, Brown was educated at Aquinas College, where he took up rowing. His senior club rowing was with the Swan River Rowing Club before winning a scholarship to the Western Australian Institute of Sport.

From 2002 to 2004 and from 2006 to 2011 Brown was selected to represent Western Australia in the men's lightweight four contesting the Penrith Cup at the Interstate Regatta within the Australian Rowing Championships. He was in the victorious West Australian fours of 2007, 2008 & 2009.

International representative rowing
Brown first represented Australia at the 2002 World Rowing Cup II in Lucerne in a lightweight coxless pair with his West Australian team-mate Tom Nicholls which placed sixth. They rowed together that same year in the World Rowing U23 Championships in Genoa taking the silver medal. In 2003 Brown and Nicholls teamed up with the Tasmanians Tom Gibson and Cameron Wurf in a lightweight coxless four. They finished in overall twelfth place at the World Rowing Cup III in Lucerne but then at the 2003 World Rowing U23 Championships in Belgrade they took the gold medal and claimed an U23 World Championship.

At the 2004 World Rowing Championships in Banyoles he won a bronze medal in the lightweight eight. At Gifu, Japan 2005 he raced in a lightweight coxless pair with George Roberts and finished in eleventh place. He continued in the coxless pair in 2007 and at the World Rowing Championships with Michael McBryde he won bronze. In 2009 he rowed in a lightweight coxless four at the World Championships to a fourteenth placing.

In 2010 at the World Championships in Lake Karapiro, Brown was seated at bow in the Australian men's lightweight eight who placed second and won the silver medal. The lightweight eight stayed together into 2011 with the changeout of Perry Ward & Angus Tyers for Rod Chisolm & Tom Gibson and a move of Darryn Purcell into the stroke seat. At the 2011 World Championships in Bled they raced their final to perfection coming through the field from the 500mark, sitting second at the 1000 and the 1500, and running down the Italians in the last 200m to take the gold by 0.17seconds, winning Brown his first and only World Championship title.

Post competitive rowing
After winning gold at the 2011 World Rowing Championships in the men's lightweight eight, he became the High Performance Development Officer with Rowing Australia.

References

External links
 
 Webster's coxswain call of the Australian LM8+ World Championship win of 2011

1981 births
Living people
Australian male rowers
People educated at Aquinas College, Perth
World Rowing Championships medalists for Australia